Bransby is a hamlet in the West Lindsey district of Lincolnshire, England.

The River Till flows past the village  to the east.

References

External links

Hamlets in Lincolnshire
West Lindsey District